Saint-Georges-sur-Arnon (literally Saint-Georges on Arnon) is a commune in the Indre department in central France.

Population

See also
Communes of the Indre department

References

External links

 Official Website

Communes of Indre